JSC Lokomotiv Kurastyru Zauyty (AQ Lokomotıv qurastyrý zaýyty) is a subsidiary of Kazakhstan's national railway company Kazakhstan Temir Zholy which builds TE33A locomotives at a factory in Nur-Sultan which was opened by President Nursultan Nazarbayev on 3 July 2009.

References

External links
 АҚ Локомотив құрастыру зауыты

Companies based in Astana
Companies of Kazakhstan
Locomotive manufacturers of Kazakhstan
Locomotives of Kazakhstan
Kazakhstani brands